Lavery, also spelled Lowry, Lowrie, Lory, Lavoy and Lowery, is an Irish surname derived from the Gaelic Ó Labhradha, meaning the "descendants of Labhradha".

The Ó Labhradha descend from Labhradh, who was the father of Etru, chief of the Monagh, a people belonging to the Irish over-kingdom of Ulaid. At the time of Etru's death in 1056, the sept was located in the area of Magh Rath (present-day Moira, County Down). It is in this area as well as the adjoining part of County Antrim where the surname is still most common. A strong concentration of them can also be found in the Montiaghs district of County Armagh, where many moved to during the Plantation of Ulster.

Due to the number of Laverys in these areas they had to adopt monikers to distinguish between them, as such there were three distinct branches: the Baun-Laverys, from the Irish word bán, meaning "white"; the Roe-Laverys, from the Irish word rua, meaning "red"; and the Trin-Laverys, from the Irish word tréan, meaning "strong". The Trin-Laverys often mistranslated their name into English as Armstrong. An example of the adoption of Armstrong is Dr. John Armstrong who was born Trenlavery.

Some of those who are Lowrys may descend from the Mac Labharaigh of Galloway, Scotland. Many of the Lowrys and Lowries in Ulster descend likewise from Scotland, where their names are variants of Laurie, a diminutive of Lawrence, common in Dumfriesshire. Notable amongst these Lowrys are the Earls of Belmore in County Fermanagh, who descend from the Lauries of Maxwelltown, Kirkcudbrightshire, Scotland.

Notable people

Laverys

Arts and entertainment
 Bryony Lavery (born 1947), British dramatist
 Emmet Lavery (1902–1986), American playwright and screenwriter 
 Emmet G. Lavery, Jr. (1927–2014), American TV and film producer 
 Fred Lavery (born 1955), Canadian singer–songwriter and music producer
 Sir John Lavery (1856–1941), Irish painter
 Hazel Lavery (1880–1935), American–Irish painter, artist's model on Irish banknotes
 Father Sean Lavery (1931–1999), Irish priest and music director
 Sean Lavery (dancer) (1956–2018), American ballet dancer and ballet master

Politics
 Cecil Lavery (1894–1967), Irish politician and judge
 Frederick Lavery (1898–1971), Australian trade unionist and politician
Ian Lavery (born 1963), British trade unionist and politician

Sport
 Patrick Lavery (1884–1915), English footballer
 Philip Lavery (born 1990), Irish cyclist

Other
 Dave Lavery (born 1959), American roboticist
 Ryan Lavery, character in the American TV drama All My Children
 William Edward Lavery (1930–2009), president of Virginia Polytechnic Institute and State University, Blacksburg, Virginia, United States
 William J. Lavery (born 1938), judge in Connecticut, United States

Lowrys
 Calvin Lowry, American football player
 Dave Lowry, ice hockey player
 Flora E. Lowry (1879–1933), American anthologist 
 Hiram Harrison Lowry, American Methodist missionary to China
 Heath W. Lowry, historian 
 Henry Berry Lowrie, Confederate outlaw
 Henry Dawson Lowry, English journalist
 James Lowry, Jr., mayor of Pittsburgh, Pennsylvania
 Joseph Wilson Lowry, 18th century engraver
 Kyle Lowry, American basketball player
 L. S. Lowry, British artist/painter
 Leonard Lowry (1884–1947), New Zealand politician
 Lois Lowry, author
 Malcolm Lowry, author and poet
 Mark Lowry, comedian
 Martin Lowry, chemist
 Michael Lowry, Irish politician
 Noah Lowry, baseball pitcher
 Oliver Lowry, a biochemist
 Ray Lowry, cartoonist, musician
 Rich Lowry, editor and columnist
 Robert Lowry (governor) (1831–1910), American politician, governor of Mississippi
 Robert Lowry (hymn writer) (1826–1899), American professor of literature, Baptist minister and composer of gospel hymns
 Robert Lowry (Indiana) (1824–1904), American politician, U.S. Representative from Indiana
 Robert Lowry (writer) (1919–1994), American novelist, short story writer and independent press publisher
 Robert Lowry, Baron Lowry (1919–1999), Lord Chief Justice of Northern Ireland and a Lord of Appeal in Ordinary
 Robert Lowry (Royal Navy officer) (1854–1920), British admiral
 Robert William Lowry, printer
 Shane Lowry (footballer), Australian/Irish footballer
 Shane Lowry (golfer), Irish golfer
 Sylvanus Lowry, American politician
 Thomas Lowry, businessman
 Tommy Lowry, English footballer

Lowery
Bill Lowery (politician) (born 1947), U.S. Republican politician from California
Bill Lowery (record producer) (1924–2004), American music entrepreneur
Clint Lowery (born 1971), guitarist of the rock band Sevendust
Corey Lowery (born 1973), bass guitarist of Eye Empire, Saint Asonia, and previously Dark New Day
David Lowery
Evelyn G. Lowery
Fred L. Lowery (born 1943), Southern Baptist clergyman and author
George H. Lowery Jr. (1913-1978), American ornithologist
Finn Lowery (1990–2019), New Zealand water polo player
Hugh Lowery (1892–1972), American football player
Ian Lowery (1956–2001), English musician
James Lowery, several people of that name
Joan Lowery Nixon (1927-2003), American journalist and author
John Lowery (born 1971), American guitarist with Marilyn Manson and Rob Zombie
Joseph Lowery (1921-2020), American minister and civil rights leader
Lee L. Lowery, Jr. (1938), Texas A&M University Engineering Professor (1967-2023) 
Lillian M. Lowery, superintendent of the Maryland State Department of Education
Mark Lowery (born 1957), member of the Arkansas House of Representatives
Robert Lowery (actor) (1913-1971), American actor
Robert O. Lowery, the first African-American New York City Fire Commissioner
Savannah Lowery, New York City Ballet soloist
Terrell Lowery (born 1970), American professional baseball player and college basketball player
Tom Lowery (born 1997), English footballer
Tony Lowery (born 1961), English footballer
Tony Lowery(born 1969), American football player
Vaughn Lowery, actor and model

See also
Laurie
Lowrey (disambiguation)

References

Ulaid